Rent may refer to:

Economics
Renting, an agreement where a payment is made for the temporary use of a good, service or property
Economic rent, any payment in excess of the cost of production
Rent-seeking, attempting to increase one's share of existing wealth without creating wealth
Rentboy or rent boy, a male prostitute

Entertainment
Rent (musical), a stage musical by Jonathan Larson
Rent (film), a 2005 movie version of the musical
Rent: Filmed Live on Broadway, 2008 film of the final Broadway performance of the musical
Rent (MUD), a game mechanic in some MUDs
"Rent" (song), a 1987 pop music hit from the Pet Shop Boys
Gross rentals, also known as distributor rentals, the distributor's share of a film's theatrical revenue at the box office

See also
Rental (disambiguation)
Rentier (disambiguation)